Lanxangia is an Asian genus of plants in the ginger family.  Species have been recorded from southern China to Indo-China.

Species 
Plants of the World Online currently includes:
 Lanxangia capsiciformis (S.Q.Tong) M.F.Newman & Skornick.
 Lanxangia coriandriodora (S.Q.Tong & Y.M.Xia) M.F.Newman & Skornick.
 Lanxangia jingxiensis (D.Fang & D.H.Qin) M.F.Newman & Skornick.
 Lanxangia paratsao-ko (S.Q.Tong & Y.M.Xia) M.F.Newman & Skornick.
 Lanxangia scarlatina (H.T.Tsai & P.S.Chen) M.F.Newman & Skornick.
 Lanxangia thysanochilila (S.Q.Tong & Y.M.Xia) M.F.Newman & Skornick.
 Lanxangia tsao-ko (Crevost & Lemarié) M.F.Newman & Skornick. - type species
 Lanxangia tuberculata (D.Fang) M.F.Newman & Skornick.

References

External links
 

Alpinioideae
 Zingiberales genera